Outsourcing is the practice of contracting a business function to a third party.

Outsourced may also refer to:
 Outsourced (album), a comedy album by Russell Peters
 Outsourced (film)
 Outsourced (TV series)